The James Joyce Centre is a museum and cultural centre in Dublin, Ireland, dedicated to promoting an understanding of the life and works of James Joyce. It opened to the public in June 1996.

The centre is situated in a restored 18th-century Georgian townhouse at 35 North Great George's Street, Dublin, dating from a time when north inner city Dublin was at the height of its grandeur. It was previously owned by the Earl of Kenmare, and a Denis Maginni, who was featured in Ulysses. It was built in 1784. On permanent exhibit is furniture from Paul Leon's apartment in Paris, where Joyce wrote much of Finnegans Wake, and the door to the home of Leopold Bloom and his wife, Molly, number 7 Eccles Street, one of the more famous addresses in literature, which had been rescued from demolition by John Ryan.

The centre does not host a significant permanent collection beyond the furnishings, but temporary exhibitions interpret various aspects of Joyce's life and work, and the centre organises lectures and literary walking tours. It has also organised the annual Bloomsday Festival in Dublin since 1994 and promotes other Joycean events, such as community Bloomsday events.

See also
There are other Joycean displays at:
 the Museum of Literature Ireland (MoLI) on St Stephen's Green
 the James Joyce Tower and Museum in Sandycove

References

External links
Official Website

Literary museums in Ireland
Museums in Dublin (city)
Irish literature
Buildings and structures completed in 1784
Museums established in 1996
James Joyce